Wildcat Canyon is a narrow linear valley just east of the Berkeley Hills in the San Francisco Bay Area, situated in Contra Costa County, California.  The canyon is bounded on its east side by the San Pablo Ridge, and is drained by Wildcat Creek which runs northwest to its outlet in San Pablo Bay.  Two minor lakes or ponds lie along the creek: Jewel Lake and Lake Anza.  The latter was enlarged by the construction of a small dam in the mid-20th century.  An active tectonic fault, the Wildcat Fault, runs the length of the canyon.  Wildcat Canyon was named for the mountain lions which used to be fairly common in the area.  The southern end of the canyon adjacent to the city of Berkeley was incorporated into Tilden Regional Park in the 1930s and remains a major recreation area for local residents.  Another regional park, Wildcat Canyon Regional Park, is situated at the northern end of the canyon.

External links
Pictures from Wildcat Canyon
History of Wildcat Creek Watershed

Canyons and gorges of California
Berkeley Hills
Landforms of Contra Costa County, California
Geography of Richmond, California